Ab Kenaru or Ab Kanaru or Ab Konaru may refer to:
 Ab Konaru, Fars, in Fars Province
 Ab Kanaru, Basht, in Kohgiluyeh and Boyer-Ahmad Province
 Ab Kenaru, Charam, in Kohgiluyeh and Boyer-Ahmad Province